Anne Schröder (also spelled Schroeder; born 11 September 1994) is a German field hockey player. She represented her country at the 2016 Summer Olympics and 2020 Summer Olympics.

References

External links 
 
 
 
 
 

1994 births
Living people
German female field hockey players
Field hockey players at the 2016 Summer Olympics
Field hockey players at the 2020 Summer Olympics
Olympic field hockey players of Germany
Sportspeople from Düsseldorf
Olympic bronze medalists for Germany
Olympic medalists in field hockey
Medalists at the 2016 Summer Olympics
Female field hockey midfielders
21st-century German women

2018 FIH Indoor Hockey World Cup players